Eryngium integrifolium, also known as blueflower eryngo or savanna eryngo, is a flowering plant in the family Apiaceae. It is native to the Southeastern United States where it is found it meadows, savannas, and flatwoods often in wet, nutrient-poor conditions. It produces dense heads of blue flowers in late summer through fall.

References

integrifolium